The Lehrde is a  long, right tributary of the river Aller in Lower Saxony, Germany.

Course 
The Lehrde continues across the southern part of the district of Verden.

Culture 
The setting for the fairy tale of the Town Musicians of Bremen is along part of the river Lehrde.

See also 
List of rivers of Lower Saxony

References

External links 
 7 photos (Rotenburg Canoe Club)

Rivers of Lower Saxony
Rivers of Germany